is a junction passenger railway station in located in the city of Fujiidera,  Osaka Prefecture, Japan, operated by the private railway operator Kintetsu Railway.

Lines
Dōmyōji  Station is served by the Minami Osaka Line, and is located 16.3 rail kilometers from the starting point of the line at Ōsaka Abenobashi Station. It is also the terminus of the 2.2 kilometer Dōmyōji Line to Kashiwara Station.

Station layout
This station consists of an island platform and a side platform on the ground, serving three tracks, connected by an underground passage. Entrances/exits are located on the south side of the side platform serving Track 3.

Platforms

Adjacent stations

History
Dōmyōji Station opened on March 24, 1898.

Passenger statistics
In fiscal 2018, the station was used by an average of 6,643 passengers daily.

Surrounding area
Dōmyō-ji
 Dōmyōji Tenman-gu

See also
List of railway stations in Japan

References

External links

 Kintetsu: Domyoji Station 

Railway stations in Japan opened in 1898
Railway stations in Osaka Prefecture
Fujiidera